Sir Brian Howard Harrison  (born 9 July 1937) is a British historian and academic. From 1996 to 2004, he was Professor of Modern History at the University of Oxford. From 2000 to 2004, he was also the Editor of the Oxford Dictionary of National Biography.

Academic career
Harrison was Professor of Modern History at the University of Oxford from 1996 to 2004. He was additionally the editor of Oxford Dictionary of National Biography from January 2000 to September 2004 (succeeded by Lawrence Goldman). Since 2004, he has been an emeritus fellow of Corpus Christi College, Oxford.

Harrison has published extensively on British social and political history from the 1790s to the present.  His first book was Drink and the Victorians. The Temperance Question England 1815–1872 (1971, 2nd. ed. 1994), based on his doctoral thesis entitled The temperance question in England, 1829–1869.  His most recent publications are two volumes in the New Oxford History of England series covering British history from 1951:

Seeking a Role: The United Kingdom 1951–1970 (2009, paperback with revisions 2011); online
 Finding a Role? The United Kingdom 1970–1990 (2010, paperback with revisions 2011). online.

For a complete list of his publications see his festschrift: 'Reform and its Complexities in Modern Britain. Essays Inspired by Sir Brian Harrison (Eds. Bruce Kinzer, Molly Kramer and Richard Trainor), Oxford University Press 2022, pp.281-5, and for a continuously updated list, his entry in 'Google Scholar' at https://scholar.google.co.uk/citations?hl=en&user=UrPsiyUAAAAJ

National Life Stories conducted an oral history interview (C1149/24) with Harrison in 2012 for its Oral History of Oral History collection held by the British Library.

His interview (video) with the Cambridge historian and social anthropologist Alan Macfarlane on 22 June 2012 can be found at https://sms.cam.ac.uk/media/1402073 and https://sms.cam.ac.uk/media/1291722

Honours
Harrison was appointed Knight Bachelor in the 2005 New Year Honours for "services to scholarship". He was elected a Fellow of the British Academy (FBA) on 30 July 2005. He is also an elected Fellow of the Royal Historical Society (FRHistS).

References

External links
 

 Interviewed by Alan Macfarlane 22 June 2012 (video)

1937 births
Living people
Alumni of the University of Oxford
Dictionary of National Biography
Fellows of Corpus Christi College, Oxford
Fellows of the British Academy
British book editors
Knights Bachelor
Oxford University Press people
Fellows of the Royal Historical Society